Satya 2 is a 2013 Indian crime film directed by Ram Gopal Varma. Shot simultaneously in Hindi and Telugu languages, the film stars Puneet Singh Ratn (Hindi), Sharwanand (Telugu), Anaika Soti and Mahesh Thakur. The film tells the story of Satya, an immigrant who comes to Mumbai aiming to refashion the mumbai underworld. The film is the fourth installment of the Gangster series.

Plot

The storyline of Satya 2 is narrated by a voice about the underworld whose activities have slowed down from the last decade in Mumbai (Hyderabad in Telugu version). The story is based on Satya who comes to Mumbai and starts working for Lahoti, a construction magnate. In trying to beat a competitor in a deal, he gets involved with the mafia and other underworld elements who don't have the clout anymore. Later, he kills RK who is the retired mafia leader and his son since his son wanted to kill Satya due to a feud between them. During this time, he gets his friend production money for a film and gets a flat and brings his girlfriend Chitra to live there. He makes enemies all around and in a shootout with cops, loses his girlfriend and also his friend. But, even though he is captured, he is able to get out of jail through the company he creates with his connections and begins his reign as the newest underworld leader in Mumbai/Hyderabad.

Cast

Telugu version

 Suresh as Subramanyam 
 Ajay Rathnam as Sambasiva Rao "Samba" 
 Shanmugarajan as Police Officer 
 Radha Ravi as Chief Minister 
 Thalaivasal Vijay as Prakash Rao

Production
"As a film maker I have been doing a deep study of the underworld and its gangsters for more than two decades primarily for the purposes of gathering subject matters for my films and to get inspired for characters from real life references..And that's how films like Satya and company happened... Then one day it occurred to me what if a guy out there studied the same gangsters not for becoming a film maker but for the purpose of becoming a gangster himself.it's that idea of mine which finally shaped itself into Satya 2. A new age gangster will obviously be armed with the mistakes of the earlier gangsters and also with the modern day policing methods". said Ram Gopal Varma. One romantic song of Satya 2 was shot in Kashmir in June 2013. The Central Board of Film Certification (CBFC) passed Satya 2 with A certificate with 3 cuts. Satya 2 is made within the budget of Rs 15 crore.

The film was promoted as a trilingual and was to mark the Tamil-language directorial debut of Varma. However, the Telugu version was partially reshot in Tamil as Naanthaanda.

Soundtrack

The background score of the film has been composed by Shakthikanth Karthick. The soundtrack of the film consisted of nine tracks composed by Nitin Raikwar, Sanjeev–Darshan, Kary Arora and Shree D and lyrics by Moied Elhaam, Nitin Raikwar, Kumaar, Sonny Ravan and Shree D on 15 October 2013.

Release and reception
Director Ram Gopal Verma hinted that Satya 2 will be his last film on the underworld and that now he wants to make romantic movies. Satya 2 was released on 2 8 October 2013 in U. A. E. and 8 November 2013 in India.

The film received mixed reviews, Subhash K. Jha of Bollywood News stated that Ram Gopal Varma returns to form with Satya 2.
Samreen Tungekar of Bolly spice has stated "Ram Gopal Verma had made it clear that Satya 2 is not a sequel to Satya, and he has evidently made no attempt of making this film look like a prequel or a sequel too. Satya 2 stands as an independent story and does well for itself as a film." Taran Adarsh of Bollywood Hungama gave it 3 out of 5 stars and stated that Satya 2 has the right elements that make a quintessential gangster film. Madhureeta Mukherjee of Times of India gave it 2 out of 5 stars.

The Telugu version released to negative reviews with Sangeetha of The Hindu advising to "skip this and watch the original Satya."

Box office
Satya 2 opened to an average opening-day occupancy of around 5 percent, the overseas market being no different with the film seeing a release in UAE.

References

External links
 
 
 
 

Films about organised crime in India
2010s Telugu-language films
2010s Hindi-language films
Films set in Mumbai
Films directed by Ram Gopal Varma
2013 films
Fictional portrayals of the Maharashtra Police
Indian gangster films
Indian multilingual films
2013 multilingual films